Open water swimming at the 2023 World Aquatics Championships will be held from 15 to 20 July 2023.

Schedule
Five events will be held.

All times are local (UTC+9).

Medal summary

Medal table

Men

Women

Team

References

External links
Official website

 
2023 World Aquatics Championships
Open water swimming at the World Aquatics Championships
2023 in swimming
Swimming competitions in Japan